Wallington is a borough in Bergen County, in the U.S. state of New Jersey. As of the 2020 United States census, the borough's population was 11,868, an increase of 533 (+4.7%) from the 2010 census count of 11,335, which in turn reflected a decline of 248 (−2.1%) from the 11,583 counted in the 2000 Census, which had in turn increased by 755 (+7.0%) from the 10,828 counted in the 1990 Census.

Wallington was created as a borough on January 2, 1895, based on a referendum held on December 31, 1894, from area taken from Bergen Township and Saddle River Township. The borough was formed during the "Boroughitis" phenomenon then sweeping through New Jersey, in which 26 boroughs were formed in Bergen County alone in 1894, with Wallington the last of the 26 to be formed by an 1894 referendum. Sections of Wallington were ceded to Garfield in 1898. The borough is said to have been named for Walling Van Winkle (1650–1725), who built a home in the future borough.

Geography
According to the United States Census Bureau, the borough had a total area of 1.05 square miles (2.71 km2), including 0.99 square miles (2.57 km2) of land and 0.05 square miles (0.14 km2) of water (5.05%).

The borough borders Carlstadt, East Rutherford, Garfield, South Hackensack and Wood-Ridge in Bergen County, and the city of Passaic in Passaic County across the Passaic River.

Demographics

The borough is one of 41 municipalities statewide where a majority of residents do not speak English as their primary language. Based on data from the United States Census Bureau's 2012–2016 American Community Survey data, Wallington had 62.8% of residents not speaking English as their dominant language, the 13th highest perecentage in the state.

2010 census

The Census Bureau's 2006–2010 American Community Survey showed that (in 2010 inflation-adjusted dollars) median household income was $58,724 (with a margin of error of +/− $3,808) and the median family income was $66,414 (+/− $7,756). Males had a median income of $46,632 (+/− $3,029) versus $40,968 (+/− $2,962) for females. The per capita income for the borough was $27,350 (+/− $1,947). About 7.0% of families and 8.7% of the population were below the poverty line, including 8.8% of those under age 18 and 10.1% of those age 65 or over.

Same-sex couples headed 25 households in 2010, a decrease from the 30 counted in 2000.

2000 census

As of the 2000 United States census there were 11,583 people, 4,752 households, and 3,041 families residing in the borough. The population density was 11,632.5 people per square mile (4,472.2/km2). There were 4,906 housing units at an average density of 4,927.0 per square mile (1,894.2/km2). The racial makeup of the borough was 87.60% White, 2.67% African American, 0.09% Native American, 4.98% Asian, 0.02% Pacific Islander, 2.32% from other races, and 2.31% from two or more races. Hispanic or Latino of any race were 6.70% of the population.

There were 4,752 households, out of which 25.7% had children under the age of 18 living with them, 48.3% were married couples living together, 11.5% had a female householder with no husband present, and 36.0% were non-families. 29.8% of all households were made up of individuals, and 11.4% had someone living alone who was 65 years of age or older. The average household size was 2.44 and the average family size was 3.05.

In the borough the population was spread out, with 18.4% under the age of 18, 8.8% from 18 to 24, 33.9% from 25 to 44, 23.7% from 45 to 64, and 15.2% who were 65 years of age or older. The median age was 38 years. For every 100 females, there were 93.0 males. For every 100 females age 18 and over, there were 90.2 males.

The median income for a household in the borough was $45,656, and the median income for a family was $55,291. Males had a median income of $40,077 versus $30,503 for females. The per capita income for the borough was $24,431. About 4.8% of families and 6.3% of the population were below the poverty line, including 6.8% of those under age 18 and 4.4% of those age 65 or over.

The most common ancestries were Polish (51.5%), Italian (15.0%), Irish (7.1%) and German.

At 51.5%, Wallington has one of the highest per capita levels of Polish ancestry in the area. Wallington was ranked seventh nationwide and first in New Jersey among municipalities in the United States by percentage of population with Polish ancestry as of the 2000 Census.

Arts and culture
Each December, Wallington holds a holiday parade. Fire departments and ambulances from the surrounding area (including the Wallington Fire Department) put Christmas lights on their trucks. There is a contest to determine which department's apparatus has the best Christmas lights. The winning department gets a trophy.

Parks and recreation
Samuel Nelkin County Park is located on Parkview Drive, covering . It has a playground, tennis courts, athletic fields, a dog park, picnic areas, and a shallow, artificial pond for fishing.

Bowlero Wallington is a bowling alley that has 48 lanes, an arcade, restaurant and bar.

Government

Local government
Wallington is governed under the Borough form of New Jersey municipal government, which is used in 218 municipalities (of the 564) statewide, making it the most common form of government in New Jersey. The governing body is comprised of a Mayor and a Borough Council, with all positions elected at-large on a partisan basis as part of the November general election. A Mayor is elected directly by the voters to a four-year term of office. The Borough Council is comprised of six members elected to serve three-year terms on a staggered basis, with two seats coming up for election each year in a three-year cycle. The Borough form of government used by Wallington is a "weak mayor / strong council" government in which council members act as the legislative body with the mayor presiding at meetings and voting only in the event of a tie. The mayor can veto ordinances subject to an override by a two-thirds majority vote of the council. The mayor makes committee and liaison assignments for council members, and most appointments are made by the mayor with the advice and consent of the council.

, the Mayor of Wallington Borough is Republican Melissa Dabal, whose term of office ends December 31, 2023. Members of the Wallington Borough Council are Council President WendySu Ivanicki (R, 2023), Khaldoun Androwis (R, 2024), Beata Balik (R, 2025), Susanne Preinfalk (R, 2025), Eugeniusz Rachelski (R, 2024) and Tomasz Sadecki (R, 2023).

In December 2021, the Borough Council selected Beata Balik from a list of three candidates nominated by the Republican municipal committee to fill the seat expiring in December 2022 that became vacant following the resignation of Tomasz Orzechowski.

Federal, state and county representation
Wallington is located in the 9th Congressional District and is part of New Jersey's 36th state legislative district.

Politics
As of March 2011, there were a total of 4,964 registered voters in Wallington, of which 1,428 (28.8% vs. 31.7% countywide) were registered as Democrats, 681 (13.7% vs. 21.1%) were registered as Republicans and 2,852 (57.5% vs. 47.1%) were registered as Unaffiliated. There were 3 voters registered as Libertarians or Greens. Among the borough's 2010 Census population, 43.8% (vs. 57.1% in Bergen County) were registered to vote, including 53.4% of those ages 18 and over (vs. 73.7% countywide).

In the 2016 presidential election, Republican Donald Trump received 2,222 votes (55.7% vs. 41.1% countywide), ahead of Democrat Hillary Clinton with 1,643 votes (41.2% vs. 54.2%) and other candidates with 126 votes (3.2% vs. 4.6%), among the 4,039 ballots cast by the borough's 5,869 registered voters, for a turnout of 68.8% (vs. 72.5% in Bergen County). In the 2012 presidential election, Democrat Barack Obama received 1,967 votes (54.4% vs. 54.8% countywide), ahead of Republican Mitt Romney with 1,548 votes (42.8% vs. 43.5%) and other candidates with 59 votes (1.6% vs. 0.9%), among the 3,615 ballots cast by the borough's 5,384 registered voters, for a turnout of 67.1% (vs. 70.4% in Bergen County). In the 2008 presidential election, Democrat Barack Obama received 1,912 votes (50.4% vs. 53.9% countywide), ahead of Republican John McCain with 1,783 votes (47.0% vs. 44.5%) and other candidates with 54 votes (1.4% vs. 0.8%), among the 3,793 ballots cast by the borough's 5,370 registered voters, for a turnout of 70.6% (vs. 76.8% in Bergen County). In the 2004 presidential election, Democrat John Kerry received 1,963 votes (53.2% vs. 51.7% countywide), ahead of Republican George W. Bush with 1,668 votes (45.2% vs. 47.2%) and other candidates with 18 votes (0.5% vs. 0.7%), among the 3,690 ballots cast by the borough's 5,187 registered voters, for a turnout of 71.1% (vs. 76.9% in the whole county).

In the 2013 gubernatorial election, Republican Chris Christie received 63.6% of the vote (1,365 cast), ahead of Democrat Barbara Buono with 35.1% (754 votes), and other candidates with 1.3% (28 votes), among the 2,264 ballots cast by the borough's 5,138 registered voters (117 ballots were spoiled), for a turnout of 44.1%. In the 2009 gubernatorial election, Republican Chris Christie received 1,131 votes (47.5% vs. 45.8% countywide), ahead of Democrat Jon Corzine with 1,053 votes (44.2% vs. 48.0%), Independent Chris Daggett with 129 votes (5.4% vs. 4.7%) and other candidates with 20 votes (0.8% vs. 0.5%), among the 2,383 ballots cast by the borough's 5,191 registered voters, yielding a 45.9% turnout (vs. 50.0% in the county).

Education
The Wallington Public Schools serve students in kindergarten through twelfth grade. As of the 2018–19 school year, the district, comprised of three schools, had an enrollment of 1,283 students and 86.1 classroom teachers (on an FTE basis), for a student–teacher ratio of 14.9:1. Schools in the district (with 2018–19 enrollment data from the National Center for Education Statistics) are 
Jefferson Elementary School with 243 students in grades K–3, 
Frank W. Gavlak Elementary School with 426 students in grades K–6 and
Wallington High School with 567 students in grades 7–12.

Public school students from the borough, and all of Bergen County, are eligible to attend the secondary education programs offered by the Bergen County Technical Schools, which include the Bergen County Academies in Hackensack, and the Bergen Tech campus in Teterboro or Paramus. The district offers programs on a shared-time or full-time basis, with admission based on a selective application process and tuition covered by the student's home school district.

Due to declining enrollment, the Roman Catholic Archdiocese of Newark closed Most Sacred Heart School after the 2013–2014 school year. The school district is in talks with the Archdiocese to temporarily lease Most Sacred Heart School starting during the 2014–2015 school year, so that Jefferson Elementary School can be closed for repair/rebuilding without straining the capacity of Frank W. Gavlak Elementary School.

Emergency services

Police
The Wallington Police Department (WPD) provides emergency and protective services to the borough. The WPD consists of 20 sworn officers, as well as special officers and crossing guards,  and is headed by a Chief of Police. The WPD responds to approximately 13,000 calls per year.

Fire / EMS
The Wallington Fire Department (WFD) is an all-volunteer fire department. The WFD was organized in October 1894 and consists of three fire companies operating out of three firehouses. The department is staffed by 85 fully trained firefighters. The Wallington Fire Department Emergency Squad provides emergency medical and rescue services.

Transportation

Roads and highways

A very short section of New Jersey Route 21 passes through Wallington. This section was built over a section of the Passaic River which was filled in to allow the highway to be constructed. However, the municipal boundary still follows the old river bed, resulting in a small section of Wallington on the west bank of the river which is mostly occupied by the highway.

County Route 507 is the most significant road directly serving Wallington. Three bridges, the Gregory Avenue Bridge (built in 1905), the Market Street Bridge (dating back to 1894) and the Eighth Street Bridge (originally constructed in 1915) cross the Passaic River from Wallington to the city of Passaic. After years of construction, a new  Eighth Street Bridge was completed in 2019 with the assistance of $15 million in aid from the federal government, restoring service to a crossing that had handled more than 6,000 vehicles per day on a bridge that was more than 100 years old.

The New Jersey Turnpike Western Roadway (Interstate 95) is accessible at Exit 16W in neighboring East Rutherford.

Public transportation
NJ Transit's Bergen County Line passes through, but does not stop in, Wallington. Wesmont station is located along the border between Wallington and Wood-Ridge, but it can only be accessed from the latter. NJ Transit bus routes 160 and 161 provide service to and from the Port Authority Bus Terminal in Midtown Manhattan, and routes 703, 707, and 780 provide local service.

Notable people

People who were born in, residents of, or otherwise closely associated with Wallington include:

 Elizabeth Calabrese, member of the Bergen County Board of Chosen Freeholders from 2004 to 2010
 George Fischbeck (1922–2015), television weatherman
 Steve Hamas (1907–1974), professional football player in the National Football League who turned to professional boxing, defeating former heavyweight champions Tommy Loughran and Max Schmelling
 Henry Helstoski (1925–1999), U.S. Congressman from 1965 to 1977, representing 
 Doris Mahalick (1924–2008), politician who served on the Bergen County Board of Chosen Freeholders, Mayor of Wallington and as the nation's first woman to serve as a county police commissioner
 Frankie Perez (born 1989), mixed martial artist who has competed in Ultimate Fighting Championship
 Ed Sanicki (1923–1998), outfielder for the Philadelphia Phillies
 Walling Van Winkle (1650–1725), namesake of Wallington who built a home here

References

Sources 

 Municipal Incorporations of the State of New Jersey (according to Counties) prepared by the Division of Local Government, Department of the Treasury (New Jersey); December 1, 1958.
 Clayton, W. Woodford; and Nelson, William. History of Bergen and Passaic Counties, New Jersey, with Biographical Sketches of Many of its Pioneers and Prominent Men., Philadelphia: Everts and Peck, 1882.
 Harvey, Cornelius Burnham (ed.), Genealogical History of Hudson and Bergen Counties, New Jersey. New York: New Jersey Genealogical Publishing Co., 1900.
 Van Valen, James M. History of Bergen County, New Jersey. New York: New Jersey Publishing and Engraving Co., 1900.
 Westervelt, Frances A. (Frances Augusta), 1858–1942, History of Bergen County, New Jersey, 1630–1923, Lewis Historical Publishing Company, 1923.

External links

 Borough of Wallington official website
 Wallington Public Schools
 
 School Data for the Wallington Public Schools, National Center for Education Statistics

 
1894 establishments in New Jersey
Borough form of New Jersey government
Boroughs in Bergen County, New Jersey
Populated places established in 1894